Niels Christian Fredborg (born  28 October 1946) is a retired Danish track cyclist. He competed at the 1964, 1968, 1972 and 1976 Summer Olympics in the sprint and 1 km time trial events, winning a silver, a gold and a bronze medal in the time trial in 1968, 1972 and 1976, respectively. In 1972 he was Denmark's only Olympic medalist.

At the Track Cycling World Championships, Fredborg won the 1 km time trial in 1967, 1968 and 1970.

References

External links
Niels Fredborg. arosfame.dk

1946 births
Living people
People from Odder Municipality
Cyclists at the 1964 Summer Olympics
Cyclists at the 1968 Summer Olympics
Cyclists at the 1972 Summer Olympics
Cyclists at the 1976 Summer Olympics
Danish male cyclists
Olympic cyclists of Denmark
Olympic bronze medalists for Denmark
Olympic silver medalists for Denmark
Olympic gold medalists for Denmark
Olympic medalists in cycling
Medalists at the 1968 Summer Olympics
Medalists at the 1972 Summer Olympics
Medalists at the 1976 Summer Olympics
Danish track cyclists
Sportspeople from the Central Denmark Region